Elias "E.Vil" Einari Johannes Viljanen (born 8 July 1975) is a Finnish musician from Tampere, Finland, known for being the guitarist for Sonata Arctica since 2007. Viljanen joined Sonata Arctica in spring 2007 in order to replace Jani Liimatainen, who left the band in August 2007 to fulfill his civil duties in Finland. The decision was only made official on 8 August 2007, but Elias Viljanen had been known to replace Liimatainen in concerts during the spring and summer tour. Viljanen cites Kiss, Metallica, Slayer, and Whitesnake as his musical influences.

Biography

Early life

Viljanen was born in 1975, and started playing the guitar at eight, in 1983. Initially, he says that he began playing "because his dad forced him... and, of course, I wanted to be like Kiss." He got his first acoustic guitar a year later, but did not get an electric guitar until nearly four years later. After finally convincing his parents to let him purchase his first electric guitar (a white Leadstar), he took a few guitar lessons and learned some basic chords, but believed that if he wanted to learn rock'n'roll, it would be something he would have to teach himself. Around that same time, Viljanen began playing in local bands, heavily influenced by Metallica's early thrash metal.

At age seventeen, his band Depravity was signed by Adipocere Records, this being Viljanen's first record contract.

In the early 1990s, Viljanen was introduced to the music of Steve Vai and Joe Satriani, but initially wrote it off as "just music for sports." As time went by, however, he developed a love of Satriani's music, calling it the "bluesiest rock'n'roll," and considers Vai "God." Viljanen also lists Dream Theater as his progressive metal influence that pushed him towards the style he is today. A little later he became a drummer in a band called Twilight Lamp, which released EP "Grandiose" in 1999.

Formation of Elias Viljanen and Evil Spirit
As 2001 approached, Viljanen felt that he had to get his own project going. He spent several months writing down his music ideas he'd had for many years, but never expressed. He did have doubts, however, about his solo project, stating: 

To prepare for his three-demo, The Axe-Master, Viljanen practiced for 2–3 hours each day for nearly four months. While he may have had doubts before, they were now erased, as the demos and recording became both a dream and an obsession. Viljanen never dreamed of getting a serious record contract out of it, but sent his demos out anyway. The record company Lion Music, however, replied and offered him a recording contract. Thus, eighteen years after the dream began, Elias Viljanen's first album, Taking the Lead was born.

Feedback for Taking the Lead was overall positive, placing in the top ten hard rock/shred CD's at guitar9.com in 2003. Steve Vai himself also got Viljanen's CD, and gave him some encouraging feedback as well. In 2004, Lion Music again offered Viljanen a record contract when he sent in new demos, and he entered the Studios with Evil Spirit in early 2005. Recording went well, and he emerged satisfied with the completion of his second solo album, The Leadstar.

Sonata Arctica and recent work
Elias Viljanen traveled with the band Sonata Arctica in 2007, filling in for their guitarist Jani Liimatainen on tour. On August 8, Sonata Arctica formally released a letter naming Viljanen the official guitarist in Sonata Arctica. Liimatainen had apparently not been fulfilling his mandatory civic duties as declared by the Finnish government, and this had caused a rift in between him and the other members of the band. Viljanen took up the mantle as guitarist with much controversy, with many hard-core fans still wanting Liimatainen to be a part of the project. But Sonata Arctica were adamant, as was Liimatainen, and Viljanen thus maintained his status.

Viljanen toured with Sonata Arctica in support of their album Unia in late 2007 and early 2008. During the time off from tour in 2008, he began work on his third studio album, but the recording of Sonata Arctica's sixth studio album. So, Viljanen entered the studio with Sonata Arctica for the first time in the earlier half of 2009, recording the album The Days of Grays. As they were touring at the time of the release, Viljanen did not get to begin recording work on his album until early 2009. Later that year, his third studio album with Evil Spirit was released, Fire-Hearted.

Personal life
Viljanen has stated that, if not a musician, he would likely be a silversmith. He enjoys the racing video game Need for Speed: Underground, likes parrots and his favorite sport is ice hockey. He is also married.

Equipment

Sonata Arctica 
Various Ibanez Jem and Universe models (Steve Vai)
However, he's been seen using custom ESP guitars, as well as he has his very own signature guitar from ESP: EV-7.

 Ibanez UV777
 Ibanez RG550XH
 Carvin DC400
 Ibanez JEM 7DBK
 ESP EV-7

Discography

Sonata Arctica
 The Days of Grays (2009)
 Live in Finland (2011)
 Stones Grow Her Name (2012)
 Pariah's Child (2014)
 Ecliptica - Revisited: 15th Anniversary Edition (2014)
 The Ninth Hour (2016)
 Talviyö (2019)

Elias Viljanen
 Taking the Lead (2002)
 The Leadstar (2005)
 Fire-Hearted (2009)
 Evillusionist (2021)
Acoustic Intelligence (2022)

Blackbay
 Arouse (2001)

Twilight Lamp
 Grandiose (1999)

Depravity
 Silence Of The Centuries (1993)

References

Sources
 Profile on the Official Sonata Arctica Website
 Official announcement concerning the departure of Jani Liimatainen

External links
 Elias Viljanen official website
 Sonata Arctica official website

Finnish heavy metal guitarists
Sonata Arctica members
Living people
1975 births
Seven-string guitarists